Manao is a long-extinct Arawakan language of Brazil. The Manaos gave their name to the present-day city of Manaus, the capital city of the state of Amazonas in Brazil.

Vocabulary
Some words in the Manao language include:

References

Languages of Brazil
Arawakan languages
Extinct languages of South America